A list of films produced by the Israeli film industry in 1983.

1983 releases

Unknown premiere date

Awards

See also
1983 in Israel

References

External links
 Israeli films of 1983 at the Internet Movie Database

Israeli
Film
1983